Philippe Felgen (born 8 October 1975) is a retired Luxembourgian football goalkeeper.

References

1975 births
Living people
Luxembourgian footballers
Jeunesse Esch players
F91 Dudelange players
FC Etzella Ettelbruck players
FC Progrès Niederkorn players
CS Oberkorn players
CS Pétange players
Association football goalkeepers
Luxembourg under-21 international footballers
Luxembourg international footballers